Craig Creek (also known as Craig's Creek or Craigs Creek) is an  tributary of the James River in the U.S. state of Virginia.

It flows northeast into Craig County, passing the village of Webbs Mill. Turning north, the creek passes the town of New Castle at the eastern end of Sinking Creek Mountain, then continues generally northeast, though making continuous large incised meanders, into Botetourt County, where it joins the James River just upstream from the town of Eagle Rock.

See also
List of rivers of Virginia

References

USGS Hydrologic Unit Map - State of Virginia (1974)

Rivers of Virginia
Tributaries of the James River
Rivers of Botetourt County, Virginia
Bodies of water of Craig County, Virginia
Rivers of Montgomery County, Virginia